Paramjeet Kaur (born 2 April 1976, in Meerut, Uttar Pradesh) is an international athlete settled in Rajasthan, India. She won a gold medal in the women's 4X400m relay in the 2000 Asian Athletics Championships held in Jakarta, Indonesia. She represented India in the Sydney Olympics 2000
 in the women's 4X400 relay event. She is the first woman athlete from Rajasthan to represent India in Olympics until 2000. She is also the first woman Olympian from the Indian Revenue Service.

Her moment of glory and pride came when she along with K. M. Beenamol, Jincy Philips, and Manjula Kuriakose broke a 13-year-old national record in the women's 4x400 relay event in the Inter State Senior Athletics Championships held in Chennai. They also clocked the world's sixth fastest time in the long relay in 2000. These quarter milers recorded a time of 3:28.11 sec, smashing the previous national record of 3:31.55 sec set in Rome in 1987 by one of Indian athletics' best relay squads, P.T. Usha, Shiny Abraham, Vandana Shanbagh, and Vandana Rao.  Their time was better than the Asian Games record of 3:29.11 sec created by China in Hiroshima.

She was awarded "Best Athlete of the Meet" for various championships during her career including three consecutive years in Inter-University meet.

Awards and honours
 Maharana Pratap Award from Government of Rajasthan (1993–97)
 Aravali Award from Maharaja of Udaipur (1993)
 Nahar Sanman Puruskar from Rajasthani Welfare Association (1997)

Achievements

Personal life
Paramjeet Kaur is married to Vijay Kumar Chaudhary, a sports enthusiast. They have two children, Yash and Mansi.

See also
List of Rajasthan Olympians

References

1976 births
Living people
Sportspeople from Meerut
Sportswomen from Rajasthan
Olympic athletes of India
Athletes (track and field) at the 2000 Summer Olympics
Indian female middle-distance runners
20th-century Indian women
20th-century Indian people
South Asian Games gold medalists for India
South Asian Games medalists in athletics
Sportswomen from Uttar Pradesh